Nicolas Inaudi (born 21 January 1978, in Chambéry) is a French former cyclist.

Palmares
2000
3rd La Côte Picarde
2004
2nd Tallinn-Tartu GP
2005
3rd Trophée des Grimpeurs

References

1978 births
Living people
French male cyclists